The 1973–74 Indiana Pacers season was Indiana's seventh season in the American Basketball Association and seventh as a team.

ABA Draft

Season standings

Eastern Division

Western Division

Player stats
Note: GP= Games played; MIN= Minutes; REB= Rebounds; AST= Assists; STL = Steals; BLK = Blocks; PTS = Points; AVG = Average

Roster

Playoffs
Western Division Semifinals vs San Antonio Spurs

Western Division Finals vs Utah Stars

Awards, records, and honors

ABA All-Stars
 Mel Daniels
 George McGinnis

References

External links
 RememberTheABA.com 1973-74 regular season and playoff results

Indiana
Indiana Pacers seasons
Indiana Pacers
Indiana Pacers